Sinivasan Pandiyan (born 6 December 1995) is an Indian professional footballer who plays as a central midfielder for Gokulam Kerala in I-League.

Career
Born in Thanjavur, Tamil Nadu, Pandiyan began his career with the Noble Football Academy in Karaikudi. While with the academy, he was coached by former India international Raman Vijayan. Pandiyan stayed at the academy until after high school. He moved back to Chennai to play for Indian Bank in the CFA Senior Division before also playing for Viva Chennai.

Chennai City
In June 2017, it was announced that Pandiyan was signed by Chennai City for the I-League. He made his professional debut for the club on 4 December 2017 in Chennai City's second match of the 2017–18 season against Gokulam Kerala. Pandiyan started and played the whole match as Chennai City drew 1–1. By the end of the season, Pandiyan had played in 17 matches for Chennai City, starting 16, while playing a pivotal role for the club from midfield and forming a partnership with Michael Soosairaj.

According to Pandiyan, he initially struggled to adapt to playing in the I-League before coming comfortable. "It was difficult at first because it was a new level altogether. I couldn’t play that well but I started to improve my game as the season went by. I adjusted to the I-League level soon and I’m very happy that I could play at such a level," he said at the end of the season.

Chennaiyin
After his breakout season with Chennai City, Pandiyan signed a three year contract with local Indian Super League side Chennaiyin on 13 April 2018.

Career statistics

Honours
Chennai City
I-League: 2018–19

References

External links 
 

1997 births
Living people
People from Thanjavur
Indian footballers
Chennai City FC players
Chennaiyin FC players
Association football midfielders
Footballers from Tamil Nadu
I-League players
Indian Super League players
Gokulam Kerala FC players